Máirín Quill (born 15 September 1936) is a former Irish politician who served as a Senator from 1997 to 2002, after being nominated by the Taoiseach. She served as a Teachta Dála (TD) for the Cork North-Central constituency from 1987 to 1997.

A schoolteacher, Quill qualified as a primary school teacher from Mary Immaculate College, Limerick; she followed her teaching diploma by studying by night at University College Cork for a degree in English and History, and then a Higher Diploma in Education.

She was first elected to Dáil Éireann for the Cork North-Central constituency at the 1987 general election. She was one of 14 Progressive Democrat TDs resulting from that party's first general election. She had previously contested the Cork City constituency at the 1977 general election and Cork North-Central at the 1981 general election, each time as a Fianna Fáil candidate and each time losing.

Quill retained her seat in two successive general elections, but lost it at the 1997 general election to Billy Kelleher of Fianna Fáil. She was then nominated by the Taoiseach, Bertie Ahern, to the 21st Seanad. She did not contest the 2002 general election.

From 1979 until 2009, she was a member of Cork City Council, representing the North East ward. She did not contest the 2009 local elections.

References

1936 births
Living people
Alumni of Mary Immaculate College, Limerick
Alumni of University College Cork
Fianna Fáil politicians
Irish schoolteachers
Local councillors in Cork (city)
Members of the 21st Seanad
20th-century women members of Seanad Éireann
21st-century women members of Seanad Éireann
Members of the 25th Dáil
Members of the 26th Dáil
Members of the 27th Dáil
20th-century women Teachtaí Dála
Nominated members of Seanad Éireann
Progressive Democrats TDs
Progressive Democrats senators